The Seneca WarChiefs are a Junior "B" box lacrosse team from Irving, New York. The WarChiefs play in the First Nations Junior B Lacrosse League (FNJBLL), sanctioned by the First Nations Lacrosse Association (FNLA).

History
Co-founded in August 2013 by long-time friends Charles Scanlan and Michael Snyder, Seneca WarChiefs were one of four founding member teams in the Iroquois Nations Junior B Lacrosse League. The WarChiefs are coached by long-time NLL player and coach Darris Kilgour. Kilgour is the winningest coach in NLL history.

Seneca played the first game in INJBLL history on May 24, 2014, defeating Tonawanda Jr. Braves 27-4 at Cattaraugus Community Center.

The WarChiefs finished their first regular season a perfect 12-0. Facing the second-place Onondaga Jr. Redhawks in the league championship, Seneca won the best-of five series 3-1 (20-7, 10-12, 18-5, 17-5). The INJBLL champions earned their spot in the 2014 Founders' Cup.

In round robin play Seneca defeated Team Quebec (22-10), Manitoba Blizzard (14-7), Team Nova Scotia (16-8) and Saskatchewan SWAT (18-8) while earning a tie against Red Deer Rampage (8-8). Their only loss in the round robin was a 12-6 defeat at the hands of the OJBLL champion Six Nations Rebels. Their 4-1-1 record was second best and earned their place in the gold medal game.

In the rematch against Six Nations, Seneca again came up second-best falling 14-7 to take the Silver Medal.

Seneca captured their third Founders' Cup medal in three years winning the Bronze in 2016.

Season-by-season results
Note: GP = Games played, W = Wins, L = Losses, T = Ties, Pts = Points, GF = Goals for, GA = Goals against

Founders' Cup

References

External links
Official website

Lacrosse of the Iroquois Confederacy
Lacrosse clubs established in 2013
2013 establishments in New York (state)
Chautauqua County, New York